The 335th Signal Command (Theater) is an operational and functional U.S. Army Reserve command of more than 4,000 Active and Reserve Soldiers, providing Signal and Cyber units in direct support of 3rd Army/USARCENT in Southwest Asia, Army Reserve exercises, and Homeland Defense missions throughout the United States.

Embracing the motto, "Ready Lightning," The 335th Signal Command (Theater) is one of the Army's four theater signal commands. 
 
The 335th Signal Command (Theater) has Army Reserve Signal Soldiers assigned to units throughout United States and overseas supporting ongoing military operations.

In 2016, the 335th Signal Command (Theater) became the Army Reserve proponent for Defensive Cyber Operations/Forces for the Army Reserve as the Army Reserve Cyber Operations Group (ARCOG) transitioned from the 76th Operational Readiness Command (ORC) to the 335th Signal Command (Theater).  This transition brings Army Reserve Cyber Protection Teams to the 335th Signal Command (Theater).

Current leadership
 Commanding General: Major General Tina B. Boyd
 Deputy Commanding General (Signal): Brigadier General Michael J. Dougherty
 Deputy Commanding General (Cyber): Brigadier General Royce P. Resoso 
 Chief of Staff: Colonel Andrew R. Howes
 Secretary of the General Staff: Major Gina K. Great
 Command Sergeant Major: CSM Russell B. Price
 Command Executive Officer: Mr. David A. Hagler
 Command Chief Warrant Officer: Chief Warrant Officer Five Lawrence A. Makuakane
 Commanding General, 335th Signal Command (Theater) (Provisional): Brigadier General Robert S. Powell Jr.

Updated 21AUG22 by MAJ Dino De La Hoya, 335th SC (T) Command Public Affairs Officer.

Current Structure 
As of 2020, the 335th Signal Command controls the following:

 335th Signal Command (Theater), in East Point, Georgia
 Headquarters and Headquarters Company
 Defense Information Systems Agency–Army Reserve Element, in Chambersburg, Pennsylvania
 Joint Communications Support Element, in Tampa, Florida
 Joint Enabling Capabilities Command–Army Reserve Element, in Norfolk, Virginia
 359th Tactical Theater Signal Brigade, at Fort Gordon, Georgia
 490th Signal Company (Tactical Installation/Networking), in Blacklick, Ohio
 982nd Combat Camera Company, in East Point, Georgia
 324th Expeditionary Signal Battalion, at Fort Gordon, Georgia
 392nd Expeditionary Signal Battalion, in Baltimore, Maryland
 505th Tactical Theater Signal Brigade, in Las Vegas, Nevada
 98th Expeditionary Signal Battalion, in Mesa, Arizona
 319th Expeditionary Signal Battalion, in Sacramento, California
 United States Army Reserve Cyber Protection Brigade

Campaign participation credit
Republic of Vietnam
Operation Desert Shield
Operation Desert Storm
Operation Enduring Freedom
Operation Iraqi Freedom
Operation Atlantic Resolve
Operation Inherent Resolve

Provisional Command 
Shortly after the 9/11 attacks, the 335th Signal Command mobilized reserve soldiers and active Army personnel to Camp Doha, Kuwait.  The unit moved to Camp Arifjan, Kuwait in 2005, where it remains today as an enduring presence in the USCENTCOM/USARCENT AOR.  Currently, the 335th Signal Command (Theater) (Provisional) provides signal support to USARCENT for Resolute Support Mission (RSM), Operation Inherent Resolve (CJTF-OIR).

Shoulder sleeve insignia
Shoulder Sleeve Insignia. Symbolism: Orange and white are the colors associated with the Signal Corps. Dark blue signifies the atmosphere and the flashes and globe are symbolic of the unit's worldwide communication capability. The shoulder sleeve insignia was approved on 30 October 1985 designed by Major Charles K Reber 20 February 1985.

Distinctive Unit Insignia
Description: A gold color metal and enamel device  in height overall consisting of two quadrates conjoined with point up, the left quadrant of white, the right of black, surmounted by two orange lightning flashes chevronwise and extending above and below the quadrates; in base, a green open wreath of Live Oak, all above a semicircular gold scroll folded back at the base of each flash and inscribed, "READY LIGHTNING" in black letters, areas between quadrates and flashes at top and quadrates and Live Oak in base are pierced. Symbolism: The white and black quadrates and the lightning flashes symbolize the organization's day and night mission to direct and coordinate the operations, training, administration and logistics support of assigned and attached units. The Live Oak, the State Tree of Georgia and a symbol of ever-ready strength in reserve, also alludes to the organization's origin and home station at Atlanta, Georgia. Orange and white are colors used for the Signal Corps. The distinctive unit insignia was originally approved on 10 December 1971 for the 335th Signal Group. It was redesignated for the 335th Signal Brigade on 24 December 1984. The insignia was redesignated for the 335th Signal Command on 16 April 1986.

Past Commanders

References

335th Theater Signal Command Websites as listed below in external links.

External links
 Official Site
 "335th Theater Signal Command" on "The Institute of Heraldry" Site
 "335th Theater Signal Command" on GlobalSecurity.org

335
Military units and formations of the United States Army Reserve
Military units and formations established in 1953
East Point, Georgia